Hope International may refer to:

Hope International (Christian microfinance), a Christian financial aid organization
Hope International (Seventh-day Adventist), a historic Adventism movement
Hope International University, located in Fullerton, California
Hope International FC, a football (soccer) club in St. Vincent and the Grenadines